Mickaël Ange Nanizayamo (born 8 May 1998) is a French professional footballer who plays for Swiss club Lausanne-Sport as a centre-back.

Club career
On 23 January 2022, Nanizayamo joined SCR Altach in Austria on loan.

Personal life
Nanizayamo is of Burundian and DR Congolese descent. He is the younger brother of Jonathan Nanizayamo.

References

External links
 

1998 births
Sportspeople from Tours, France
Footballers from Centre-Val de Loire
Black French sportspeople
French people of Burundian descent
French sportspeople of Democratic Republic of the Congo descent
Living people
French footballers
France youth international footballers
Association football defenders
Tours FC players
FC Lausanne-Sport players
SC Rheindorf Altach players
Championnat National 3 players
Ligue 2 players
Swiss 1. Liga (football) players
Swiss Super League players
Swiss Challenge League players
French expatriate footballers
French expatriate sportspeople in Switzerland
Expatriate footballers in Switzerland
French expatriate sportspeople in Austria
Expatriate footballers in Austria